American Job is a 1996 independent film directed by Chris Smith. Shot in a satirical pseudo-documentary style, the film follows Randy, a young man living in a Midwestern US town, as he tries one mundane job after another, including monitoring a machine at a plastics factory, working as a clean-up person at a fast-food restaurant, cleaning motels, and becoming a telephone solicitor.

Inspiration
The film was directly inspired by the 1987 magazine "American Job" created by Randy Russell, which was a collection of job stories from low-wage workers around the United States.

Synopsis

American Job is a narrative film about Randy Scott (Randy Russell), a youth caught in the dismal confusion of living and working in the world of minimum wage.  The film follows Randy through a number of low-paying, menial jobs including fast food dishwasher, custodian, telemarketer, and factory worker.  It highlights the sheer boredom of minimum wage work and is a slightly comical and occasionally depressing look at what life is like in the US minimum wage arena.

Production
American Job was filmed in 1995 in the midwestern United States for $14,000 (USD). It was director Chris Smith's first film.

Reception
In 1996, the film was part of a roving national exhibition as part of the Fuel Tour.  It screened in 1996 at the Museum of Modern Art in New York City as part of the museum's Cineprobe series, and was also screened at the 1996 SXSW Film Festival in Austin, Texas. It has received positive reviews by various media outlets. Nicolas Rapold of The New York Sun later called it "Easily one of the decade's best indie debuts" and likened it to Mike Judge's 1999 cult workplace comedy Office Space. 

The film  also garnered director Chris Smith with a 1997 Independent Spirit Award nomination for the Someone to Watch Award.

References

External links
 

Films directed by Chris Smith
1996 films
1996 documentary films
American documentary films
1990s English-language films
1990s American films